Michałkowice  is a settlement in the administrative district of Gmina Świerklany, within Rybnik County, Silesian Voivodeship, in southern Poland. It is part of the village of Jankowice Rybnickie.

References

Villages in Rybnik County